Teri Rah Mein is a Pakistani drama series that premiered on ARY Digital on January 3rd in 2022. Directed by Khurram Walter and written by Nadia Ahmed, it is a production of iDream Entertainment. It has Zainab Shabbir, Shazeal Shoukat, Usama Khan and Shahroz Sabzwari in lead roles.

Synopsis 
Teri Rah Mein is the story of two university friends, Emaan and Maha belonging to different backgrounds who later become arch-rivals.

Cast 
 Zainab Shabbir as Emaan
 Shahroz Sabzwari as Ahmar
 Shazeal Shoukat as Maha
 Usama Khan as Fakhar
 Sana Fakhar as Samia
 Saiqa as Emaan's mother
 Daniyal Khan as Daniyal
 Sangeeta as Bakhtiar's mother
 Sohail Sameer as Faisal
 Nida Hussain as Faria
 Afshan Qureshi as Samia and Faria's mother
 Naima Khan as Najma
 Tabbasum Arif as Samina 
 Behroze Sabzwari as Bakhtiar
 Abdullah Khan as Umair
 Tehseen Tasneem

References

External links 
 Official website

Pakistani drama television series
2022 Pakistani television series debuts
Pakistani television series
Urdu-language television shows